Geir Karlsen may refer to:
 Geir Karlsen (football player) (born 1948), a Norwegian goalie
 Geir Karlsen (businessman) (born 1965), a Norwegian business magnate